The Kanpur Lucknow Roadways Service is a bus service operated by Uttar Pradesh State Road Transport Corporation in the Indian state of Uttar Pradesh, connecting its legislative capital Lucknow with the industrial capital at Kanpur.

About 

A wide variety of bus services are provided, including Ordinary buses, as well as air conditioned services using buses from Sheetal, Shatabdi and Volvo. The company also offers a sleeper bus service.

Service 

Service between the two cities runs every 5 to 10 minutes at peak times. The outward and return fares for the under two hour journey differ by the route taken.

See also
Lucknow-Kanpur Suburban Railway
Lucknow Upnagariya Parivahan Sewa
Faizabad Bus Depot

References

Transport in Kanpur
Transport in Lucknow
Bus companies of India
State road transport corporations of India
State agencies of Uttar Pradesh
1951 establishments in Uttar Pradesh